Major General Nguyễn Khoa Nam (23 September 1927 – 30 April 1975), was a native of Đà Nẵng and served in the Army of the Republic of Vietnam (ARVN). He received his primary education at the École des Garçons in Đà Nẵng and graduated in 1939. After joining the French-sponsored Vietnam National Army (VNA), he attended the Thủ Đức Military Academy and graduated in 1953.

Military service
As a sub-lieutenant, his (chuan uy's) first assignment was to an airborne unit. He served in various positions within the VNA during the First Indochina War (1953–1955) and joined the ARVN in 1955. He served as a lieutenant in the airborne, a company commander in the 7th Airborne Battalion, a major in command of 5th Airborne Battalion, as lieutenant colonel (and later colonel) of the 3rd Airborne Brigade. 

In January 1970 he was appointed as commander of the 7th Division where he was credited with making remarkable progress and later promoted to Brigadier General. He then served as a major general commanding IV Corps Tactical Zone.

His numerous decorations include the  National Order of Vietnam Fourth Class medal and National Order of Vietnam Third Class medal. As a major general, General Nam liked to carried out a military operations across Mekong Delta to prevent VC taking over any regional districts. 

On 30 April 1975, with the Fall of Saigon, rather than fleeing the country or surrendering, General Nam and his deputy commander, General Lê Văn Hưng shot themselves dead. General Nam was buried at Cần Thơ Military Cemetery the following day.

References

External links
Nguyễn Khoa Nam's Official site
VNAF The Republic of Vietnam Air Force - Không Quân Việt Nam Cộng Hòa
Republic of Vietnam Armed Forces Reunion 2003
Vietnam War Bibliography: The ARVN and the RVN
History of the Army of the Republic of Vietnam
Hue Massacre Tet Offensive Photos
Liberation of Giai Phong Dan Toi from Communist Viet Cong by Army of the Republic of Vietnam: Photos
The Battle for Hue, 1968 by James H. Willbanks
The Final Day of My Husband's Life 
http://www.nguyenkhoanam.com

1927 births
1975 suicides
Army of the Republic of Vietnam generals
Deaths by firearm in Vietnam

4 Nguyen, Khoa Nam
Vietnamese anti-communists

Suicides by firearm